Perrinia stellata is a species of sea snail, a marine gastropod mollusk in the family Chilodontidae .

Description
The shell size varies between 9 mm to 17 mm

Distribution
This species is distributed in the Red Sea and the Western Indian Ocean.

References

 Kilburn, R.N. (1977) Taxonomic studies on the marine Mollusca of southern Africa and Mozambique. Part 1. Annals of the Natal Museum, 23, 173–214.
 Vine, P. (1986). Red Sea Invertebrates. Immel Publishing, London. 224 pp
 Bosch D.T., Dance S.P., Moolenbeek R.G. & Oliver P.G. (1995) Seashells of eastern Arabia. Dubai: Motivate Publishing. 296 pp.
 Reid D.G. (2007) The genus Echinolittorina Habe, 1956 (Gastropoda: Littorinidae) in the Indo-West Pacific Ocean. Zootaxa 1420: 1–161
 Herbert D.G. (2012) A revision of the Chilodontidae (Gastropoda: Vetigastropoda: Seguenzioidea) of southern Africa and the south-western Indian Ocean. African Invertebrates, 53(2): 381–502.

External links
 

stellata
Gastropods described in 1864